The 2018–19 season was the 73rd season in HNK Rijekas history. It was their 28th successive season in the Croatian First Football League, and 45th successive top tier season.

Competitions

Overall

Last updated: 25 May 2019.

HT Prva liga

Classification

Results summary

Results by round

Results by opponent

Source: 2018–19 Croatian First Football League article

Matches

HT Prva liga

Source: Croatian Football Federation

Croatian Cup

Source: Croatian Football Federation

UEFA Europa League

Source: uefa.com

Friendlies

Pre-season

On-season

Mid-season

Player seasonal records
Updated 25 May 2019. Competitive matches only.

Goals

Source: Competitive matches

Clean sheets

Source: Competitive matches

Disciplinary record

Source: nk-rijeka.hr

Appearances and goals

Source: nk-rijeka.hr

Suspensions

Penalties

Overview of statistics

Transfers

In

Source: Glasilo Hrvatskog nogometnog saveza

Out

Source: Glasilo Hrvatskog nogometnog saveza

Spending:  €800,000
Income:  €12,580,000
Expenditure:  €11,780,000

Notes

References

2018-19
Croatian football clubs 2018–19 season
2018–19 UEFA Europa League participants seasons